Nenad Zivkovic may refer to:
Nenad Živković (born 1989), Serbian footballer
Nenad Zivkovic (footballer, born 2002), Swiss footballer